Nurse Sherri is a 1978 American supernatural horror film directed by Al Adamson and starring Jill Jacobson, Geoffrey Land, and Marilyn Joi. Produced and distributed by Independent-International Pictures, the film's plot follows a nurse who becomes possessed by a vengeful preacher. The film is also known under such titles as The Possession of Nurse Sherri and Black Voodoo, as well as Beyond the Living, Hospital of Terror, Killer's Curse, and Hands of Death.

Cast
 Geoffrey Land as Peter Desmond
 Jill Jacobson as Sherri Martin
 Marilyn Joi as Tara Williams
 Katherine Pass as Beth Dillon (as Mary Kay Pass)
 Prentiss Moulden as Marcus Washington
 Bill Roy as Reanhauer
 Erwin Fuller as Charlie
 J.C. Wells as Stevens
 Clay Foster as Dr. Nelson (as Clayton Foster)
 Caryl Briscoe as Nurse Gordon
 Jack Barnes as Dr. Andrews

Home media
In 2017, the film was restored in 2K and released on DVD and Blu-ray by Vinegar Syndrome.

References

External links
 

1970s supernatural horror films
1970s exploitation films
1978 horror films
1978 films
American supernatural horror films
American exploitation films
Films set in hospitals
1970s English-language films
Films directed by Al Adamson
1970s American films